HMS Scylla was a  of the Royal Navy. She was built by Scotts Shipbuilding and Engineering Company (Greenock, Scotland), with the keel being laid down on 19 April 1939.  She was launched on 24 July 1940, and commissioned 12 June 1942.

One of two sisters (the other was, appropriately, see Scylla and Charybdis), Scylla was completed with four twin QF 4.5 in Mk.III in UD MK III mountings because of a shortage of the intended QF 5.25 inch gun mountings.

The forward superstructure was considerably modified to accommodate these and also to increase crew spaces. Known as the 'toothless terrors', they proved to be very good anti-aircraft ships, often leading to comparisons with their sisters armed with the heavier QF  guns.

History

Scylla served with the Home Fleet escorting Arctic convoys. She was flagship of R. Adm. Robert Burnett during the battle for convoy PQ 18 in September 1942. She carried a signals intelligence team headed by F/O R. E. Gunn and on at least one trip to the Kola Peninsula she is reported as having collected Signals Intelligence (PRO HW 14/53 and 55). Scylla sailed for Gibraltar on 28 October 1942. The following month she was at the French North Africa landings (Operation Torch) as part of Force "O" with the Eastern Task Force, but in December was sent into the Bay of Biscay as part of the effort to catch homecoming Axis blockade runners.

On 31 December 1942, she was directed to the German blockade runner  by a RAF Coastal Command Whitley from 502 Squadron based at RAF St Eval, Cornwall. The aircraft piloted by F/O Arthur Hodgson had located Rhakotis in appalling weather but after several attack runs they had run out of ammunition. F/O Hodgson was awarded the DFC for his part in the operation. In February she returned to the Home Fleet for Arctic convoys but was back in the Bay of Biscay by June 1943 to cover anti-submarine operations.

In July 1943 she stopped the Arklow schooner  in the Bay of Biscay. Captain Dowds, formerly principal of the Irish Nautical College, was captain of the schooner. The officer in charge of the boarding party was a pupil of Dowds.  There was a pleasant reunion, then Mary B Mitchell resumed her voyage to Lisbon, and Scylla continued her search for blockade runners.

In September 1943 Scylla was part of the Support Carrier Force at the Salerno landings (Operation Avalanche) but came home to refit for duty as an Escort Carrier Flagship in October, which lasted until April 1944. The Scylla was one of two Dido class cruisers fitted with, an Action Information Organisation (AIO) room (the other was HMS Royalist) to co-ordinate radar and intercept information. Scylla was the allotted RN flagship for the Normandy landings and the flagship for Vice Admiral Philip Vian and it was considered vital to all shipping and naval movements in the area, particularly that of coastal RN MTBs and enemy E boats, to prevent blue on blue incidents. She served off Normandy as flagship of the Eastern Task Force, for 18 days.

On 23 June 1944 Scylla was badly damaged by a mine and written off. Although towed to Portsmouth, she was not disposed of until 1950, after use as a target between 1948 and 1950. She arrived at Thos. W. Ward, (Barrow-in-Furness, UK)  on 4 May 1950 for breaking up.

Footnotes

References

Further reading

External links

 WWII cruisers
 HMS Scylla at navalhistory.net
 HMS Scylla at Uboat.net
 Newsreel video of HMS Scylla fighting the Luftwaffe while protecting convoy PQ18 
 SS City of Cairo
 London Gazette

 

Dido-class cruisers
Ships built on the River Clyde
1940 ships
World War II cruisers of the United Kingdom
Maritime incidents in June 1944